Henry Hodgkins (11 November 1868 – 24 June 1952) was an English cricketer. He played for Gloucestershire between 1900 and 1901.

References

1868 births
1952 deaths
English cricketers
Gloucestershire cricketers
Sportspeople from Cheltenham
Bedfordshire cricketers
Berkshire cricketers